Dimple Hayathi is an Indian actress who predominantly works in Telugu and Tamil films.

Early life 
Hayathi was born and brought up in Hyderabad. She was born as Dimple but later suffixed her name with Hayathi for numerological reasons.

Career
Hayathi started her film career by debuting with the Telugu film Gulf (2017) at the age of 19. Later, Hayathi starred in a Telugu film Eureka before starring in the bilingual film Devi 2 (2019).  Her next appearance was in an item number "Jarra Jarra" song opposite Varun Tej and Atharvaa in the film Gaddalakonda Ganesh  (2019).

Filmography

References

External links 

Indian film actresses
1988 births
21st-century Indian actresses
Actresses in Telugu cinema
Actresses in Tamil cinema
Living people
Telugu actresses
Actresses from Andhra Pradesh
Actresses from Vijayawada
Actresses in Hindi cinema